The 1905–06 Syracuse Orangemen basketball team represented Syracuse University during the 1905–06 college men's basketball season. The head coach was John A. R. Scott, coaching his third season with the Orangemen.

Schedule

|-

*The 1/12/1906 meeting against Williams ended with a forfeit from Williams, giving Syracuse the victory.

Source

Roster
 Art Powell
 Eddie Dollard
 George Kirchgrasser
 George Redlein
 Max Riehl
 John Stark
 David Lee
 Jack Scully

References

Syracuse
Syracuse Orange men's basketball seasons
Syracuse Orange Basketball Team
Syracuse Orange Basketball Team